"Top of the World" is a song by American singer Brandy Norwood, from her second studio album, Never Say Never (1998). The song was written by Rodney "Darkchild" Jerkins, Fred Jerkins III, LaShawn Daniels, Isaac Phillips, Nycolia "Tye-V" Turman, and Mason Betha, with Darkchild and Norwood producing and Mase having featured vocals. Released as the album's second international single in 1998, the track peaked at number two on the UK Singles Chart and reached the top 20 in Iceland, Ireland, and New Zealand.

The music video for "Top of the World" was directed by Paul Hunter in June 1998 and became a huge success on the music video channels, BET and MTV. In the video, Norwood floats in the air where she does somersaults and other gymnastic movements. She performed the song live at the MTV Movie Awards and the remix version with Big Pun and Fat Joe at the Soul Train Awards which aired in 1999. Norwood performed the song on her first world tour Never Say Never World Tour (1998-1999), the TV special Brandy in Concert: A Special for the Holidays (1999) and on her second world tour, Human World Tour (2009) where it was part of a "1990s medley".

Chart performance
"Top of the World" topped the UK R&B Singles Chart for six weeks and reached number two on the UK Singles Chart. The song became the second consecutive European success for Brandy and peaked at number 20 on the Eurochart Hot 100. "Top of the World" also charted at number 11 on the New Zealand Singles Chart and 21 on the Canadian RPM Top Singles chart. In the United States, it was a modest hit on the Billboard charts, peaking at number 44 on the Hot 100 Airplay chart, number 19 on the Hot R&B Singles chart, and number 10 on the Rhythmic chart.

Music video
A music video for "Top of the World" was directed by Paul Hunter and filmed in June 1998. A surrealistic clip built on digital effects, it features Norwood floating in the air, flipping and somersaulting above various objects such as telephone poles and vehicles—as passersby stopped to stare—and balancing vertically and horizontally alongside skyscrapers and other buildings.

Remix
A remix version with Latin rappers Fat Joe and Big Pun appeared on Pun's 2001 compilation album Endangered Species. The Darkchild-produced song was previously released on the remix EP U Don't Know Me (Like U Used To) - The Remix EP (1999). The remix samples Ahmad's single "Back in the Day."

Track listings

Notes
  denotes additional producer
Sample credits
 "Top of the World (Part II)" samples "Back in the Day" (1994) by Ahmad, written by Ahmad Lewis and Stephan Gordy.

Credits and personnel
Credits are adapted from the liner notes of Never Say Never.

 Mason Betha — vocals, writing
 LaShawn Daniels — vocal production, recording, writing
 Brian Gardner — mastering
 Jean-Marie Horvat — recording
 Fred Jerkins III — writing
 Rodney Jerkins — production, instruments, mixing, recording, writing

 Brandy Norwood — additional production, vocals, writing
 Isaac Phillips — recording
 Rick Sigel — recording
 Dexter Simmons — mixing
 Nycolia "Tye-V" Turman — writing
 Brian Young — assistant engineer

Charts

Weekly charts

Year-end charts

Certifications

Release history

References

1998 singles
1998 songs
Big Pun songs
Brandy Norwood songs
Fat Joe songs
Mase songs
Music videos directed by Paul Hunter (director)
Song recordings produced by Rodney Jerkins
Songs written by Fred Jerkins III
Songs written by LaShawn Daniels
Songs written by Mase
Songs written by Rodney Jerkins
Songs written by Traci Hale